The Dwyer Stakes is an American Grade III stakes race for three-year-old thoroughbred racehorses held annually at Belmont Park racetrack in Elmont, Long Island, New York. Run in early July, it is open to three-year-old horses and is raced over a distance of 1 mile on dirt. It currently offers a purse of $500,000.

Inaugurated in 1887 as the Brooklyn Derby at the now defunct Gravesend Race Track on Coney Island, in 1918 it was renamed for the Dwyer brothers, Mike & Phil, who dominated thoroughbred racing in the late 19th century. At one time, it was a Grade I stakes race that was a major part of the American Thoroughbred racing season. It was known as the Dwyer Handicap from 1957 to 1978.

Since inception, the race has been contested at various distances:
 1 mile : 2015 to present
  miles – 1887–1924, 1935–1939, 1994 to 2014
  miles – 1888–1897, 1915–1924, 1935–1939, 1975–1993, 2010
  miles – 1956–1959
  miles – 1910–1914, 1925, 1940–1955, 1960–1974
  miles – 1925
  miles – 1887, 1898–1909, 1926–1934

The race has been held at:
 Gravesend Race Track – 1887–1910
 Old Aqueduct Racetrack – 1913–1955
 Aqueduct Racetrack – 1960–1974, 1976
 Jamaica Race Course – 1956, 1959
 Belmont Park – 1977 to present

In 1908 Fair Play was the first of three generations to win the Dwyer. His son, Man o' War, won it in 1920; and Man o' War's sons American Flag and Crusader won it in 1925 and 1926, respectively. The 1920 Dwyer turned into a match race when the owner of John P. Grier was the only one willing to run their horse against Man o' War. However, confronting John P. Grier proved to be one of his hardest races.  The two horses raced head-to-head for most of the distance until John P. Grier put his nose in front at the eighth pole, but Man o' War came back to win by more than a length.

This race was downgraded to a Grade III for its 2014 running.

Records
Speed  record:
 at 1 mile – 1:33.74 – Firenze Fire (2018)
 at  miles – 1:40.02 – Medallist (2004)

Most wins by a jockey:
 6 – Jerry D. Bailey (1983, 1996, 1997, 1999, 2001, 2005)

Most wins by a trainer:
 9 – Jim Fitzsimmons (1922, 1930, 1932, 1935, 1939, 1949, 1955, 1957, 1961)

Most wins by an owner:
 6 – Belair Stud (1930, 1932, 1935, 1939, 1949, 1955)
 6 – Greentree Stable (1931, 1956, 1963, 1968, 1973, 1974)

Winners

* In 1940, Snow Ridge finished first, but was disqualified.* In 1992, Three Peat finished first but was disqualified and set back to second.

References

 The 2009 Dwyer Stakes at the NTRA

External links
 The Dwyer Stakes at Pedigree Query

1887 establishments in New York (state)
Horse races in New York (state)
Gravesend Race Track
Jamaica Race Course
Belmont Park
Flat horse races for three-year-olds
Graded stakes races in the United States
Recurring sporting events established in 1887